Caroline Champion de Crespigny (1797–1861) was an early 19th-century English poet and translator. In the tradition of Romanticism, she published My Souvenir, or, Poems in 1844. Her translations, mainly from German into English, were often made in collaboration with Thomas Medwin, the cousin and biographer of Percy Bysshe Shelley.

Early life
Caroline Champion de Crespigny was born Caroline Bathurst at Durham in 1797 into a political and literary family. At the time of her birth her father Rt Rev Dr Henry Bathurst (1744–1837) was prebendary canon at Durham Cathedral, later becoming Bishop of Norwich. Her uncle, Allen Bathurst, 1st Earl Bathurst (1684- 1775) was a Government minister and literary patron and friend of, amongst others, Laurence Sterne and William Congreve Her mother  was Grace Coote, a sister of Sir Eyre Coote, a military governor of Jamaica.  One of her siblings Benjamin Bathurst gained notoriety during the Napoleonic War by his sudden, unexplained disappearance.

In her early twenties she may have been a mistress of Lord Byron as opined in letters by Julie Gmelin. Whilst this is a possibility it may also be dubious speculation from Gmelin, who also records her as an accomplished harpist and harpsichord player. A number of watercolours also survive her. In July 1820 Caroline Bathurst married Heaton Champion de Crespigny, later vicar of Neatishead in Norfolk, settling in Vevey in Switzerland where their first child Eyre was born in May 1821. Her husband was profligate, and family letters written by Bishop Bathurst detail that by 1828 Heaton was in serious debt and unable to adequately support his wife and four children who were living in Cheltenham in destitution. The marriage had ended by 1837 when her father died and she came into her own money.

Heidelberg

A decision was made around 1840 to relocate the family to Heidelberg in Grand Duchy of Baden, Germany, where there was a small English literary community.  It was in Heidelberg in 1841 that de Crespigny met the "friend", mentioned in the preface to her collection of poems, My Souvenir published in 1844. Thomas Medwin was the cousin and biographer of Percy Bysshe Shelly and Lord Byron. Their shared enthusiasm  of Shelley  may have been a catalyst to their lasting intimacy. In 1842 Medwin published a novel Lady Singleton where de Crespigny's verse appears at the head of some chapters and she is probably "the high-born and highly gifted lady" that Medwin thanks in his preface for the novel. Neither was financially secure enough to divorce their spouse, and the relationship was primarily intellectual. They spent the next twenty years until de Crespigny's death in 1861 participating in the literary life of this university city. Their mixed German and English friends included, amongst others, Fanny Brawne Lindon, a lover and muse of John Keats and Mary and William Howitt. In 1848 Revolution swept through Germany including Heidelberg and de Crespigny and Medwin thought it judicious to exit to more peaceable Weinsberg in Württemberg where their host was poet, Justinus Kerner.

My Souvenir, or, Poems (1844) 
Her most significant publication, still in print, appeared in 1844. My Souvenir includes original poems, together with a number of translations, from Latin, Spanish, Portuguese, French and German poets. It is probable that Medwin, a skilled polyglot is responsible for some of these translations but he is not credited. Some of the original poems refer to subject matter related to her own family, such as Lines Written on Hearing of the Death My Niece Rosa Bathurst, Drowned in The Tiber, Aged Seventeen or For My Mother's Tomb at Malvern. The style is late romantic.

An anonymous reviewer of My Souvenir referred to the original verses as distinguished by "elegance, sweetness, and tenderness rather than power or passion", adding that the translations "are selected with taste and feeling; and those from German are not the least attractive portion of the volume".

Two further volumes of translations and original poems appeared in quick succession: The Enchanted Rose: A Romant In Three Cantos, a translation from Ernst Schulze and A Vision of Great Men (1848) which concentrated on translating the poems of German poetesses

Whilst De Crespigny's own work remained hidden, her translations of poets such as Maciej Kazimierz Sarbiewski, Annette von Droste-Hülshoff and Justinus Kerner introduced these literary figures to a wider English-speaking audience.

Later years
Source material for de Crespigny's final years until her death in Heidelberg on 26 December 1861 is sparse, and knowledge is largely from the correspondence of her admirer Thomas Medwin. In 1858 he published, in The New Monthly Magazine, Renderings in Latin that contained the last contemporaneous translations by Caroline de Crespigny.

In 2016 The Bodleian Library, University of Oxford acquired an album of her verses and drawings providing scholars with access to her work.

Notes

References

1797 births
1861 deaths
19th-century English people
Writers from Norwich
English women poets
English poets
Romantic poets
English translators
Bathurst family
English women non-fiction writers
19th-century women writers
19th-century British translators
19th-century English women